Shen Fu (26 December 1763 – after 1825), courtesy name Sanbai, was a Chinese writer of the Qing Dynasty, best known for his autobiography Six Records of a Floating Life.

Life

Shen Fu was born in Changzhou (长洲, in Suzhou, Jiangsu province) in 1763. He was known as a great writer and wrote one of the best known descriptions of everyday life during the Qing Dynasty, Six Records of a Floating Life. In this text, which was completed in 1807, Shen Fu describes the gentle personality of his wife, Chen Yun, and his love for her. He also chronicles the rejection of Chen Yun by his parents and her untimely death. Shen Fu was a government clerk, a yamen private secretary.

An English translation of Six Records of a Floating Life is available as a Penguin paperback.  It is considered a great classic of Chinese literature.  A more recent translation, also easily available, is Graham Sanders' translation as Six Records of a Life Adrift.

References

External links

 

1763 births
1820s deaths
Qing dynasty novelists
Writers from Suzhou
Chinese male novelists